Traycho Petkov (4 September 1923 – 1975) was a Bulgarian footballer. He competed in the men's tournament at the 1952 Summer Olympics.

References

External links
 

1923 births
1975 deaths
Bulgarian footballers
Bulgaria international footballers
Olympic footballers of Bulgaria
Footballers at the 1952 Summer Olympics
Place of birth missing
Association football defenders
FC Lokomotiv 1929 Sofia players